Isabel is a Spanish historical fiction television series, directed by Jordi Frades and produced by Diagonal TV for Televisión Española. The series is based upon the reign of Queen Isabella I of Castile. It was broadcast on La 1 of Televisión Española from 2012 to 2014.

Production 
The project for the Isabel's biopic was first tasked by Televisión Española (TVE) to Isla Producciones, but TVE did not find the screenplay satisfactory. The series was then commissioned to Diagonal TV, with a writing team formed by Javier Olivares, Jordi Calafí and Anaïs Schaaff. Filming began in Summer 2011 and took place in several Spanish cities: Cáceres, Madrid and Segovia. The first season premiered on 10 September 2012, after an eight-month delay. The series was initially expected to debut on 30 January 2012, but a budget cut for TVE postponed the premiere.

In November 2012, the show was renewed for a second season. After disagreements with Diagonal TV early in the production of season 1, series creator's Javier Olivares determined not to return for the next season. Filming of the second season began in February 2013. Part of the shooting took place on location at the Alhambra in Granada. TVE approved the third season in July 2013 before the second season premiered.

Synopsis 
This series is a biography about Isabella, Queen of Castile. The first season chronicles the period between 1461 and 1474: from the end of her childhood to her marriage with Ferdinand of Aragon and her difficult arrival to the Crown.

The second season chronicles the period between 1474 and 1492: from her crowning to the conquest of Granada and the beginning of the journey of Christopher Columbus.

The third series covers the marriages of Joanna and Philip and Juan and Margaret, the subsequent deaths of Isabella's children Juan and Isabel as well as the latter's son Miguel along with the marriages of Catherine of Aragon and Maria of Aragon.

Cast

Episodes and ratings

Season 1 (2012)

Season 2 (2013)

Season 3 (2014)

International broadcasts
The rights to broadcast Isabel were acquired in the United Kingdom by Sky Arts in 2013.

In Mexico, Canal 22 acquired the rights and premiered the series on 6 August 2013.

In Chile, the series airs on TVN.

In Brazil, the series is aired on a daily basis on + Globosat

In Israel, the series aired weekly during 2017 on yes (Israel)'s Viva channel.

In Bulgaria the series (Isabell of Castile) starts on 5 February 2014 air on bTV.

In the United States, the series aired on Estrella TV on Sunday nights from 16 March 2014 until 2018.

In the Arab World, Isabel airs on weekdays on MBC Action.

In Serbia, the series airs on national television RTS1 .

Awards

|-
| align = "center" | 2012
| Ondas Awards
| Best Spanish Series
| Isabel
| 
| 
|-
| rowspan="24" align = "center" |2013
| rowspan="3"|New York Latin ACE Awards
| Best Cultural Program / Series
| Isabel
| 
| rowspan="3"|
|-
| Best Actress 
| Michelle Jenner
| 
|-
| Best Supporting Actor 
| Pablo Derqui
| 
|-
| rowspan="2"| Fotogramas de Plata
| Best TV Actor 
| Rodolfo Sancho
| 
| rowspan="2"|
|-
| Best TV Actress 
| Michelle Jenner
| 
|-
| rowspan="8"|Iris Awards
| Best Fiction
| Isabel
| 
| rowspan="8"|
|-
| Best Actor
| Rodolfo Sancho
| 
|-
| Best Actress
| Michelle Jenner
| 
|-
| Best Writing
| Writing team
| 
|-
| Best Direction
| Jordi Frades
| 
|-
| Best Production
| Jaume Banacolocha and Joan Bas
| 
|-
| Best Art Direction
| Marcelo Pacheco and Pepe Reyes
| 
|-
| Best Makeup and Hairstyling
| Makeup and Hairstyling team
| 
|-
| rowspan="7"|Actors and Actresses Union Awards
| rowspan="2"|Best TV Lead Actor 
| Ginés García Millán
| 
| rowspan="7"|
|-
| Pablo Derqui
| 
|-
| Best TV Lead Actress 
| Michelle Jenner
| 
|-
| rowspan="2"|Best TV Supporting Actor 
| Pedro Casablanc
| 
|-
| Sergio Peris-Mencheta
| 
|-
| Best TV Supporting Actress 
| Bárbara Lennie
| 
|-
| Best TV Actress in a Minor Role
| Clara Sanchís
| 
|-
| World Media Festival
| Best International Series
| Isabel
|  style="background:#dce5e5; text-align:center;"| Silver Award
| 
|-
| New York Festivals World's Best TV & Films
| Best Drama
| Isabel
| 
| 
|-
| rowspan="2"|Premios Zapping
| Best Series 
| Isabel
| 
| rowspan="2"|
|-
| Best Actress
| Michelle Jenner
| 
|}

Other media

La corona partida and Carlos, Rey Emperador
In April 2015, TVE announced the production of the film La corona partida. The film focuses on the aftermath of Queen Isabella's death. Jordi Frades, director of the series, also directed the film, and Rodolfo Sancho (as King Ferdinand), Irene Escolar (as Joanna the Mad), Raúl Merida (as Philip the Handsome) and Eusebio Poncela (as Francisco Jiménez de Cisneros) reprised their roles. The film served as the link between Isabel and the series Carlos, rey emperador, which is based upon the reign of Charles I, Isabella's grandson.

Crossover with El ministerio del tiempo
Michelle Jenner and Eusebio Poncela reprised the roles of Isabella I of Castile and Francisco Jiménez de Cisneros respectively in the El ministerio del tiempo episode "Una negociación a tiempo".

References
Citations

Bibliography

External links
 
 Isabel on RTVE Play
 Official site

2012 Spanish television series debuts
2014 Spanish television series endings
2010s Spanish drama television series
Television series about the history of Spain
Television series set in the 15th century
Television series set in the 16th century
La 1 (Spanish TV channel) network series
Cultural depictions of Isabella I of Castile
Ferdinand II of Aragon
Cultural depictions of Joanna of Castile
Reconquista in fiction
Television shows filmed in Spain
Spanish biographical television series
Television series by Diagonal TV